Tang Paradise is a large theme park in the city of Xi'an, the capital of Shaanxi province, Northwest China. The park is at or near the site of an earlier garden Furong Garden (芙蓉园) complex in the city of Chang'an, capital of Tang Dynasty, but consists almost entirely of modern construction.

The park features numerous buildings, squares, and gardens, all incorporating features of traditional Tang Chinese architecture, such as eaves and cornices. Some features are named after historical sites or buildings.

The park is one of several modern reconstructions of ancient sites in Shaanxi, which involve anachronistic styles and features, most notably the use of wide stretches of concrete surfaces.

The setting, a landscaped  site surrounding a willow-lined lake, captures something of the look and feel of classical Chinese landscape painting.

In the evening the many thousands of visitors are treated to a spectacular Lake Show, featuring Lasers, video projection onto water screens, fountains and other special effects. The show was created by a UK company - LCI Projects Ltd.

References

External Category
http://www.tangparadise.cn/

Tourist attractions in Xi'an